Jerome Bernard Orbach (October 20, 1935 – December 28, 2004) was an American actor and singer, described at the time of his death as "one of the last bona fide leading men of the Broadway musical and global celebrity on television" and a "versatile stage and film actor".

Orbach's professional career began on the New York stage, both on and off-Broadway, where he created roles such as El Gallo in the original off-Broadway run of The Fantasticks (1960) and became the first performer to sing that show's standard "Try to Remember", Billy Flynn in the original Chicago (1975–1977), and Julian Marsh in 42nd Street (1980–1985). Nominated for multiple Tony Awards, Orbach won for his performance as Chuck Baxter in Promises, Promises (1968–1972).

Later in his career, Orbach played supporting roles in films such as Prince of the City (1981), Dirty Dancing (1987), Crimes and Misdemeanors (1989), and, as a voice actor, Disney's Beauty and the Beast (1991). He also made frequent guest appearances on television, including a recurring role on Murder, She Wrote as private detective Harry McGraw between 1985 and 1991, and was the voice of Zachary Foxx in The Adventures of the Galaxy Rangers in 1986. He gained worldwide fame for starring as NYPD Detective Lennie Briscoe on the original Law & Order series from 1992 to 2004.

Early life
Orbach was born on October 20, 1935, in the Bronx, the only child of Emily Orbach (née Olexy), a greeting card manufacturer and radio singer, and Leon Orbach, a restaurant manager and vaudeville performer. His father was a Jewish immigrant from Hamburg, Germany. Orbach said his father was descended from Sephardic Jewish refugees from the Spanish Inquisition. His mother, a native of Luzerne County, Pennsylvania, was a Roman Catholic of Polish-Lithuanian descent, and Orbach was raised in her faith (a religious background later replicated in his character on Law & Order). The Orbach family moved frequently during his childhood, living in Mount Vernon, New York; Wilkes-Barre, Nanticoke, and Scranton, Pennsylvania; Springfield, Massachusetts; and Waukegan, Illinois. Orbach attended Waukegan High School and graduated in 1952 (having skipped two grades in elementary school due to his high IQ of 163). He played on the football team and began learning acting in a speech class.

The summer after graduating from high school, Orbach worked at the theatre of Chevy Chase Country Club of Wheeling, Illinois, and enrolled at the University of Illinois Urbana-Champaign in the fall. In 1953, Orbach returned to the Chicago area and enrolled at Northwestern University. Orbach left Northwestern before his senior year and moved to New York City in 1955 to pursue acting and to study at the Actors Studio, where one of his instructors was the studio's founder, Lee Strasberg.

Career

Orbach would go on to become an accomplished Broadway and off-Broadway actor. His first major role was El Gallo in the original 1960 cast of the decades-running hit The Fantasticks, and Orbach became the first to perform the show's signature song and pop standard "Try To Remember". He also starred in The Threepenny Opera; Carnival!, the musical version of the movie Lili (his Broadway debut); in revivals of Annie Get Your Gun and Guys and Dolls (as Sky Masterson, receiving a Tony Award nomination for Best Featured Actor in a Musical); Promises, Promises (as Chuck Baxter, winning a Tony Award for Best Actor in a Musical); the original productions of Chicago (as Billy Flynn, receiving another Tony Award nomination); 42nd Street; and a revival of The Cradle Will Rock. Orbach made occasional film and TV appearances into the 1970s and appeared as a celebrity panelist on both What's My Line? and Super Password.

In the 1980s, Orbach shifted to film and TV work full-time. Prominent roles included tough, corrupt NYPD narcotics detective Gus Levy in Sidney Lumet's Prince of the City; he was the 1981 runner-up for the NSFC Best Supporting Actor award. He also portrayed gangsters in both the action-thriller F/X and the Woody Allen drama Crimes and Misdemeanors (the latter of which also featured his future Law & Order co-star Sam Waterston). In 1985, Orbach became a regular guest star on Murder, She Wrote as private detective Harry McGraw, which led to him starring in the short-lived spin-off series The Law & Harry McGraw. In 1987, he was featured in the hit film Dirty Dancing as Dr. Jake Houseman, the father of Jennifer Grey's character "Baby". He made further TV appearances on popular shows such as The Golden Girls (for which he received his first Emmy nomination), Who's the Boss?, and Frasier (as a guest caller).

In 1991, Orbach starred in Steven Seagal's action film Out for Justice as  police captain Ronnie Donziger, and starred in Disney's Oscar-winning animated musical Beauty and the Beast as the voice (both singing and speaking) of the French-accented candelabrum Lumière, which he played "halfway between Maurice Chevalier and Pepé Le Pew". At the 64th Academy Awards, Orbach performed a live-action stage rendition of the Oscar-nominated song, "Be Our Guest", that he sang in Beauty and the Beast. He later reprised his voice role of Lumière for the film's direct-to-video sequels, multiple episodes of Disney's House of Mouse, and the previously-deleted song ("Human Again") that was added to the Beauty and the Beast 2002 IMAX re-release.

In 1992, Orbach joined the main cast of Law & Order during its third season as the world-weary, wisecracking NYPD homicide detective Lennie Briscoe. He had previously guest-starred as a defense attorney on the series, and was subsequently cast as the new "senior detective" following Paul Sorvino's departure. Orbach's portrayal of Briscoe was based on his similar role from Prince of the City years before, which Law & Order creator Dick Wolf had personally suggested to him at the time of his casting. Orbach starred on Law & Order for 11-and-a-half seasons, ultimately becoming the third longest-serving main cast member (behind S. Epatha Merkerson and Sam Waterston) in the show's 20-year-run history, as well as one of its most popular. During Orbach's tenure on Law & Order, the series won the 1997 Primetime Emmy Award for Outstanding Drama Series among other accolades, made multiple crossover episodes with fellow NBC series Homicide: Life on the Street, and spawned a franchise that included the TV film Exiled: A Law & Order Movie, the spin-off series Law & Order: Special Victims Unit and Law & Order: Criminal Intent (both of which featured Orbach in guest appearances), and three video games. Orbach himself was nominated for a 2000 Primetime Emmy Award for Outstanding Lead Actor in a Drama Series (losing to James Gandolfini for The Sopranos). TV Guide named Lennie Briscoe one of their top-25 greatest television detectives of all time.

Also during his time on Law & Order, Orbach provided the voice of the main antagonist Sa'luk in the 1996 direct-to-video film Aladdin and the King of Thieves, and co-starred with Al Pacino in the independent film Chinese Coffee, which was filmed in the summer of 1997 and released three years later.

Personal life
Orbach was married in 1958 to Marta Curro, with whom he had two sons, Anthony Nicholas and Christopher Benjamin. They divorced in 1975. Elder son Tony is a construction manager and an accomplished crossword puzzle constructor who has published more than 25 puzzles in The New York Times. Younger son Chris Orbach is an actor and a singer; he played Lennie Briscoe's nephew Ken Briscoe during the first season of Special Victims Unit.

In 1979, Jerry Orbach married Broadway dancer Elaine Cancilla, whom he met while starring in Chicago.

Orbach lived in a high-rise on 53rd Street off Eighth Avenue in Hell's Kitchen and was a fixture in that neighborhood's restaurants and shops. His glossy publicity photo hangs in Ms. Buffy's French Cleaners, and he was a regular at some of the Italian restaurants nearby. As of 2007, the intersection of 8th Avenue and 53rd Street was renamed in honor of Orbach. The plans met with some resistance by local planning boards, but were overcome thanks to his popularity and his love of the Big Apple.

Illness and death
In January 1994, less than two years into his stint on Law & Order, Orbach was diagnosed with prostate cancer. He was treated with radiation therapy, but by December 1994, the cancer had returned and metastasized. At that point, he went on hormone therapy, on which he remained over the next decade while he continued to star on Law & Order. After he left the series at the end of the 2003–04 season, Orbach underwent chemotherapy, but he ultimately succumbed to his cancer on December 28, 2004, at the Memorial Sloan Kettering Cancer Center in New York at age 69. Orbach's decade-long illness was not revealed to the general public until just weeks before he died. Orbach was signed to continue in the role of Lennie Briscoe on the new spin-off Law & Order: Trial by Jury, which gave him a lighter schedule than did the original series, but he was only featured in the first two episodes, both of which aired after his death.

The day after Orbach's death, the marquees on Broadway were dimmed in mourning, one of the highest honors of the American theatre world, while NBC re-aired the Law & Order episode  "C.O.D." (the last episode of the original series to feature Orbach) in honor of him. The Criminal Intent episode "View from Up Here" and the Trial by Jury episode "Baby Boom" were dedicated to Orbach, and the Law & Order episode "Mammon" featured a pictorial memorial of him.

In addition to his sons, wife, and former wife, Orbach was survived by his mother and two grandchildren, Peter and Sarah Kate Orbach, children of his older son Tony. His mother died on July 28, 2012, at the age of 101. His wife Elaine died in 2009 at age 69, and his former wife Marta died in 2012 at age 79. Having had perfect 20/20 vision his whole life, Jerry Orbach requested that his eyes be donated after his death. His wish was granted when two people – one who needed correction for a nearsighted eye and another who needed correction for a farsighted eye – received Orbach's corneas. His likeness has been used in an ad campaign for Eye Bank for Sight Restoration in Manhattan. Orbach was interred at Trinity Church Cemetery and Mausoleum in upper Manhattan.

Honors and legacy

In addition to his Tony Award and nominations, Jerry Orbach is also a member of the American Theater Hall of Fame, having been inducted in 1999. In 2002, Orbach was named a "Living Landmark" by the New York Landmarks Conservancy, along with his Law & Order co-star Sam Waterston. Orbach quipped that the honor meant "that they can't tear me down."

On February 5, 2005, he was posthumously awarded a Screen Actors Guild Award for Outstanding Performance by a Male Actor in a Drama Series for his longtime role on Law & Order. His wife Elaine accepted the award on his behalf.

On September 18, 2007, a portion of New York City's 53rd Street near Eighth Avenue was renamed "Jerry Orbach Way" in his honor.

In 2007, the Jerry Orbach Theatre was named for him in the Snapple Theater Center at 50th Street and Broadway in New York City. At the time, the theater was mounting a revival of The Fantasticks.

Remembrances

After Law & Order was cancelled in 2010, executive producer René Balcer told The Wall Street Journal: "I always think about the show as before Jerry and after Jerry...You saw the weariness of 25 years of crime-fighting in New York written on his face."

Author Kurt Vonnegut, a fan of Orbach, said during an Australian radio interview in 2005, "People have asked me, you know, 'Who would you rather be, than yourself?'," and he replied "Jerry Orbach, without a question...I talked to him one time, and he's adorable."

New York Times writers Ben Brantley and Richard Severo analyzed the breadth and scope of Orbach's career, and Dirty Dancing co-star Patrick Swayze memorialized Orbach after his death

Filmography

Awards and nominations

Partial discography
Jerry Orbach: Off Broadway (MGM Records, 1963).

Bibliography 
Remember How I Love You: Love Letters from an Extraordinary Marriage (Touchstone, 2009). 
Jerry Orbach, Prince of the City: His Way from the Fantasticks to Law & Order by John Anthony Gilvey, was published on May 1, 2011.

References

External links
 
 
 
 
 
 
 
 
 
 Jerry Orbach obituary (The Washington Post)
 Biography and Interview from "Broadway;  The American Musical" 
 "Law and Order Star Jerry Orbach Dies" (MSNBC)
 Jerry Orbach Memorial, Richard Rodgers Theater, March 24, 2005

1935 births
2004 deaths
Actors from Scranton, Pennsylvania
Actors from Springfield, Massachusetts
Actors from Waukegan, Illinois
Actors from Wilkes-Barre, Pennsylvania
American male film actors
American male musical theatre actors
American male television actors
American male voice actors
American people of German-Jewish descent
American people of Polish descent
American Roman Catholics
Burials at Trinity Church Cemetery
Deaths from cancer in New York (state)
Deaths from prostate cancer
21st-century American male actors
Lee Strasberg Theatre and Film Institute alumni
Male actors from New York City
Musicians from Scranton, Pennsylvania
Northwestern University School of Communication alumni
Outstanding Performance by a Male Actor in a Drama Series Screen Actors Guild Award winners
People from Greenwich Village
People from Hell's Kitchen, Manhattan
People from the Bronx
Tony Award winners
University of Illinois Urbana-Champaign alumni
Organ transplant donors
20th-century American male actors
Jewish American male actors
American Sephardic Jews
American people of Sephardic-Jewish descent
20th-century American male singers
20th-century American singers